Erechthias zebrina is a fungus moth (family Tineidae). Initially, it was mistakenly believed to be an ermine moth (family Yponomeutidae) of genus Argyresthia.

This species has a wingspan of 8–10 mm. It was first described by Arthur Gardiner Butler in 1881 from Hawaii, but is a widespread species reported from Africa, the Seychelles, Réunion, Mauritius, Sri Lanka, India, Australia, China, Java, Borneo, Fiji, Samoa, Society Islands, South America (including Brazil) and the West Indies.

The larvae have been collected amongst old books, in a mud dauber's abandoned nest, in houses, and on the trunk of Aleurites moluccanus. It is believed to feed upon arthropod remains and other detritus.

References

External links

Clarke, J. F. Gates (1971). The Lepidoptera of Rapa Island. Smithsonian Contributions to Zoology. (56)

Erechthiinae
Moths of Africa
Moths described in 1881